François Louis Auguste Goiran (born 27 April 1847 in Nice, France - died 4 April 1927 in Johannesburg, South Africa) was a French soldier and politician. He was Minister of War in 1911 and Mayor of Nice from 1912 to 1919.

References

French soldiers
French politicians
1847 births
1927 deaths
Mayors of Nice